Mars Hill is a mountain located in Mars Hill, Maine, and gave the town its name.

The mountain plays an important role in the Mars Hill community, and overlooks the Saint John Valley, in which Mars Hill is located. Mount Katahdin is visible from the top of Mars Hill over 85 miles (135 km) away. Mars Hill also has a ski area, called Big Rock Ski Area.

By virtue of its height and Northeast location, the summit of Mars Hill is the first place in the contiguous United States to see the sun rise for nearly half of the year, from March 25 to September 18. The first 50-star flag to see the sun in the U.S. was raised on July 4, 1960, at 4:33 AM.  Fifty national guardsmen gave it a 50-gun salute.

Wind farm 

Mars Hill underwent an $85 million wind power project in the fall of 2006.  First Wind installed 28 General Electric 1.5 megawatt turbines along the top and northern sections of the mountain. With a capacity factor of 35%, the wind 
farm generates about 130 million kilowatt hours (kW·h) per year (15 MW·yr/yr). 
The wind turbines are assembled in multiple parts. The towers, which are composed of three support sections stacked one on top of another with a combined weight of 20,000 pounds, are 262 ft (80 m) tall. The three blades (together, a rotor) attached to the hub of the turbine each span approximately 115 ft (37.5 m), for a rotor diameter of approximately 250 feet — comparable to the wingspan of a Boeing 747 jet-liner.

See also 
 List of mountains in Maine
 Wind power in Maine

Notes

External links 

  peakbagger.com: Mars Hill
 Mars Hill Wind Farm Webcam
 slideshow of Mars Hill Wind Farm

Mountains of Maine
Wind farms in Maine
Landforms of Aroostook County, Maine